Sveagruva, or simply Svea, was a mining settlement in the Norwegian archipelago of Svalbard, lying at the head of Van Mijenfjord.
It was the third largest settlement in the archipelago (after Longyearbyen and Barentsburg). Around 300 workers living in Longyearbyen commuted to Sveagruva for work on a daily or weekly basis. The mine was operated by Store Norske Spitsbergen Kulkompani. Sveagruva closed in 2017 and currently has no permanent inhabitants.

History
The town was established in 1917 by Swedes.  It was thereafter destroyed in 1944, but quickly re-established after World War II. The mining activity ceased in 1949, and was not re-established until 1970. Mining was suspended for a short period in 1987. In the 1990s, the town nearly vanished, as mines in Longyearbyen proved more productive and accessible. In 2005, a mine fire erupted, lasting uninterrupted for more than five weeks, and causing 700 million Norwegian kroner worth of damage.

Sveagruva held the most productive coal mine of Svalbard, the Svea Nord longwall mine. Opened in 2001, the mine produced up to 4 million metric tons of coal annually, making it one of the largest underground coal mines in Europe. The mine closed for good in March 2020.

Sveagruva closed in 2017 due to economic conditions.

Weather and Climate

References

 
Barents Sea
Company towns in Norway
Populated places in Svalbard
Populated places established in 1917
1917 establishments in Norway
Spitsbergen